Sampson County is the second largest county, by land area, in the U.S. state of North Carolina. As of the 2020 census, the population was 59,036. Its county seat is Clinton.

History
Sampson County was established in April 1784 following the American Revolutionary War. The North Carolina General Assembly annexed land from the neighboring Duplin County. The neighboring Wayne County and New Hanover counties would be annexed later.

Early settlers were Scots-Irish immigrants from Northern Ireland, many came to colonial North Carolina under the protection and inducements of Henry McCulloch, a wealthy London merchant. The community of Taylors Bridge was one of the earliest European settled areas of the county. Pioneer families lived there as early as the 1730s or 1740s. The first settlers of the area were Edmond Matthis, William Johnson, William Robinson and John Register, followed by members of the Peterson, Knowles, Vann, Boney, Merritt, Pearson, Powell, Herring, Rogers, Bryant, Blue, Ezzell, James Murphy, Ward, Sellers, Parrish, Fryar, Williamson and Bass families. In 1745, McCulloch obtained grants from the British Crown covering some 71,160 acres of land "lying and situated on the branches of the North East and Black River." The Scot-Irish immigrants were soon joined by descendants of the Swiss colony in New Bern. Later on, they were joined by pioneers from the northern states of New Jersey, Connecticut and Massachusetts.

Among the first European settlers of the area was John Sampson. Sampson was appointed as the first Register of Deeds for Duplin County. He served as a Lt. Colonel, and then a Lt. General in the county's militia, and was later elected as the first mayor of Wilmington. Sampson brought with him Richard Clinton, believed to be his stepson.

As an adult, Clinton soon distinguished himself in governmental and military service, serving as Duplin County's Register of Deeds for ten years. He was elected to the Provincial Congress held at Hillsboro. In 1776, at the outbreak of the Revolution, Clinton organized a company of militia from upper Duplin County and led them as captain in the defense of Wilmington against the British. He was later appointed Colonel of Cavalry and Brigadier General of the Fayetteville District. Upon the establishment of the state government of North Carolina by the Halifax Constitution of 1776, Clinton was elected as one of the first members of the House of Commons, representing the County of Duplin as a House member. Clinton continued as a representative of Duplin County until the creation of Sampson County in 1784. Clinton secured passage of the act creating the new county, and proposed the name "Sampson" in honor of John Sampson, his stepfather and benefactor.

According to the 2000 census, there were 1,029 members of the state-recognized Coharie Intra-tribal Council, Inc., a state-recognized tribe in Sampson County, who claim "descent from certain tribes of Indians originally inhabiting the coastal regions of North Carolina."

George Edwin Butler, author of The Croatan Indians of Sampson County, North Carolina. Their Origin and Racial Status. A Plea for Separate Schools (1916), claimed that the Croatan were mixed-race descendants of English settlers on the Lost Colony of Roanoke Island. The persons associated as Croatan were variously classified as "White", "Mulatto", "Colored", and "Negro" in the censuses of the 19th century. There was no category for Indian.

But most historians do not believe the myth of the Croatan Indians in North Carolina. No records exist of any English settlement inland of the North Carolina coast prior to 1703, when John Lawson explored the inner region of the territory. Butler claimed that Lawson had come across Native Americans who were tilling the land in the English style, speaking an antiquated English, having gray and blue eyes, and wanting Lawson to teach them how to "speak from a book" as their forefathers did. Mainline historians have found no evidence that any Europeans survived from Roanoke Island. DNA analysis of the "Indians" of Sampson County have not supported such early 20th c. myths.

Geography

It is the second-largest county in North Carolina, and the largest in terms of land area. It is second to Robeson County, which has a total area of 

The county is in the watersheds of the Black and South Rivers and Six Run Creek.

Major water bodies 
 Black River, home of the oldest documented Taxodium distichum (bald cypress) at  years old, located in Bladen County
 Great Coharie Creek (Black River tributary)
 Little Coharie Creek
 Mingo Swamp (South River tributary)
 Six Run Creek
 South River

Adjacent counties
 Johnston County – north
 Wayne County – northeast
 Duplin County – east
 Pender County – southeast
 Bladen County – southwest
 Cumberland County – west
 Harnett County – northwest

Major highways 

  (Concurrency with US 117)

Major infrastructure 
 Clinton-Sampson County Airport (IATA: CTZ, ICAO: KCTZ, FAA LID: CTZ) is a public use airport located two nautical miles (4 km) southwest of the central business district of Clinton, a city in Sampson County, North Carolina, United States. It is owned by the city and county.

Demographics

2020 census

As of the 2020 United States census, there were 59,036 people, 23,416 households, and 15,705 families residing in the county.

2010 census
As of the census of 2010, there were 63,431 people, 22,624 households, and 16,214 families residing in the county.  The population density was 67.1 people per square mile (25/km2).  There were 26,476 housing units at an average density of 27 per square mile (10/km2).  The racial makeup of the county was 56.7% White, 27% Black or African American, 2% Native American, 0.4% Asian, 0.1% Pacific Islander and 2% from two or more races.  16.5% of the population were Hispanic or Latino of any race.

There were 22,273 households, out of which 33.40% had children under the age of 18 living with them, 53.60% were married couples living together, 14.30% had a female householder with no husband present, and 27.20% were non-families. 23.70% of all households were made up of individuals, and 10.20% had someone living alone who was 65 years of age or older.  The average household size was 2.64 and the average family size was 3.09.

In the county, the population was spread out, with 25.80% under the age of 18, 9.40% from 18 to 24, 29.70% from 25 to 44, 22.30% from 45 to 64, and 12.80% who were 65 years of age or older.  The median age was 35 years. For every 100 females there were 98.20 males.  For every 100 females age 18 and over, there were 95.90 males.

The median income for a household in the county was $31,793, and the median income for a family was $38,072. Males had a median income of $26,806 versus $20,657 for females. The per capita income for the county was $14,976.  About 13.50% of families and 17.60% of the population were below the poverty line, including 21.50% of those under age 18 and 21.50% of those age 65 or over.

Sampson County is also one of the largest producers of hogs in the nation, and second in the state, with a population of over 2 million hogs.

Government and politics
Currently Sampson County leans strongly towards the Republican Party in presidential elections. No Democratic presidential candidate has gained an absolute majority of Sampson County's votes in a presidential election since Jimmy Carter did so in 1980, although Bill Clinton won a plurality in 1992 and Bob Dole's 1996 plurality was just ninety-one votes out of over seventeen thousand.

Historically the county was unusual in the South in turning strongly towards the Republican Party between the 1890s and World War II – a time when most of the region was solidifying as the overwhelmingly Democratic "Solid South". Even with its historic Populism a fading memory, and no Unionist history, Sampson was one of seven North Carolina counties to vote for Wendell Willkie in 1940, and one of fourteen to vote for Thomas E. Dewey in 1944. This was due to the fact that it was the leading centre for the Populist Party during the 1890s under local hero Marion Butler – more so indeed than Nash and Chatham counties which had given James B. Weaver a plurality in the 1892 election – and the fact that to compete with the dominant Democratic Party the two would fuse, with the result that after the Populists' demise its adherents turned to the Republicans.

In the North Carolina House of Representatives, Sampson County is in the 22nd District with Bladen County, represented by Republican William D. Brisson, In the North Carolina Senate, it lies within the 9h Senate District, represented by Republican Brent Jackson.

Economy
Historically, Sampson County has been an agricultural county with a slow rise in population since the creation of the county. The agricultural sector continues to be one of the leading pillars of the economy.  Leading industries prior to the 20th century were naval stores, timber and agriculture. After the Civil War, the Naval Stores and timber industries began to lose production value in the county to the lack of cheap labor due to the eradication of slavery among other factors; as a result, subsistence agriculture became the primary industry.  The county has steadily gained stronger manufacturing and services industries since the Civil War.

As of 2007, agricultural land covered over 50% of the county's land area. A wide range of crops are grown in the county ranging from vegetables, fruits and berries to tobacco, peanuts, corn, soybeans and wheat.  Manufacturing, agriculture, healthcare, education and retail are the primary sources of employment in the county.

As of 2012, Sampson County is the largest producer of hay and flue-cured tobacco in North Carolina. Sampson County is the largest producer of turkeys and the second largest producer of hogs in the state.

Education
Sampson County has a county-wide public school system for the grades of K-12 with the exception of the City of Clinton, which has its own public school district for grades K-12.  The only post-secondary public institution in the county is Sampson Community College. Hobbton High School is the oldest school building in Sampson County; located in Newton Grove, it is a small 1A school.

County schools

Elementary schools

 Clement
 Hargrove
 Hobbton
 Midway
 Plain View
 Roseboro
 Salemburg
 Union

Intermediate school
 Union

Middle schools
 Hobbton
 Midway
 Union
 Roseboro-Salemburg

High schools
 Union
 Hobbton
 Midway
 Lakewood
 Sampson Early College High School

Clinton-City Schools
Elementary schools
 Butler Avenue
 L.C. Kerr
 Sunset Avenue

Middle school
 Sampson

High school
 Clinton

Libraries
The Sampson County Library System serves Sampson County residents through four different libraries and a specialized outreach service intended for patrons who are home-bound and unable to visit the library. The libraries share a publicly accessible catalog and courier service. The Sampson County Library System offers online resources including eBooks, audiobooks, numerous genealogy databases, and online Driver's Education. The libraries also participate in Interlibrary Loan services. Computer classes and Story Time programs are offered at the member libraries.

Library Locations
 J.C. Holliday Library (Clinton)
 Bryan Memorial Library (Newton Grove)
 Miriam Lamb Memorial Library (Garland)
 Roseboro Public Library (Roseboro)

The J.C. Holliday Library in Clinton is the headquarters library for the county. It houses the largest collection of items including research materials and a local history and genealogy collection. There are also reference and children's services provided at this branch.

Communities

City
 Clinton (county seat and largest city)

Towns
 Autryville
 Garland
 Harrells
 Newton Grove
 Roseboro
 Salemburg
 Turkey

Census-designated places

 Bonnetsville
 Delway
 Ingold
 Ivanhoe
 Keener
 Plain View
 Spiveys Corner
 Vann Crossroads

Unincorporated communities
 Moltonville
 Suttontown

Townships

 Belvoir
 Dismal
 Franklin
 Halls
 Herring
 Honeycutt
 Lisbon
 Little Coharie
 McDaniels
 Mingo
 Newton Grove
 North Clinton
 Piney Grove
 Plain View
 Rebel City
 South Clinton
 South River
 Taylors Bridge
 Turkey
 Westbrook

Notable people
 William R. King, a politician and diplomat who was elected both to the House of Representatives and the Senate. In 1852, he was elected as the 13th US vice-president on a ticket with Franklin Pierce.
 Micajah Autry, American merchant, poet and lawyer who died in the Texas Revolution at the Battle of the Alamo.
 Theophilus H. Holmes, was a career United States Army officer and a Confederate Lieutenant General in the American Civil War.
 James Kenan, a military leader of the American Revolutionary War, and an early senator of the state of North Carolina. 
 Robert Herring Wright, the first president of East Carolina Teachers Training School.
 Marion Butler, a Populist U.S. senator from the state of North Carolina between 1895 and 1901. and brother of George Edwin Butler.
 George Edwin Butler, a local Lawyer, Civic Leader, and Author of The Croatan Indians of Sampson County, North Carolina. Their Origin and Racial Status. A Plea for Separate Schools.
 Lauch Faircloth, U.S. Senator (R-NC) 1993–99, born: January 14, 1928
 Gwendolyn Faison, Former Mayor of Camden, New Jersey (2000–2010)
 Gabriel Holmes, 21st Governor of North Carolina 1821–1824, (1769 – September 26, 1829)
 Theophilus H. Holmes, U.S. Army officer and Confederate general in the American Civil War (November 13, 1804 – June 21, 1880)
 Rufus G. Herring, United States Naval Reserve Officer and recipient of the Medal of Honor for his actions in World War II.
 John Merrick, African American entrepreneur, founder and president of North Carolina Mutual Life Insurance Company, which for much of the 20th century was the largest company run by African Americans in the U.S.
 Curtis Smith, World Champion and Hall of Fame Drag Racer.
 Willie Weeks, an American Bass Guitarist and Musician.

See also
 List of counties in North Carolina
 National Register of Historic Places listings in Sampson County, North Carolina
 List of future Interstate Highways

References

External links

 
 
 NCGenWeb Sampson County – free genealogy resources for the county

 
1784 establishments in North Carolina
Populated places established in 1784